Paul Nicholas Fisher, known by the stage name Fisher (stylised as FISHER) is an Australian music producer. He was nominated for the 2018 ARIA Award for Best Dance Release as well as the Best Dance Recording category at the 61st Annual Grammy Awards for his solo single "Losing It".

Career

Surfing
Fisher was a pro surfer on the World Qualifying Series before starting a career in music.

Music
Fisher was one half of the DJ duo Cut Snake. The group was formed with fellow surfer Leigh "Sedz" Sedley. The duo started DJing together while traveling on the pro surfing circuit.

Fisher later went solo and started releasing house music tracks under the stage name Fisher. In June 2017, Fisher released his debut single "Ya Kidding", followed by the EP "Oi Oi" in November 2017, which includes the tracks "Stop It" and "Ya Didn't".

In March 2018, Fisher released "Crowd Control". "Crowd Control" came in at number 116 in the Triple J Hottest 100 of 2018.

In July 2018, Fisher released "Losing It" which reached number one on the ARIA Club Tracks Chart and made the top 50 on Billboards Hot Dance/Electronic Songs, Dance/Mix Show Airplay, and Dance Club Songs, the latter becoming his first number one in the United States. "Losing It" also garnered Fisher his first Grammy nomination for "Best Dance Recording" at the 2019 Grammys. "Losing It" came in at number 2 in the Triple J Hottest 100 of 2018.

On 10 May 2019, Fisher released "You Little Beauty", which became his second number one on the Dance Club Songs chart. "You Little Beauty" came in at number 53 in the Triple J Hottest 100 of 2019.

On 20 March 2020, Fisher released "Freaks", the lead single from his extended play of the same name. The EP was released on 31 March, alongside the second single “Wanna Go Dancin’”.

Discography

Extended plays

Singles

Awards and nominations

AIR Awards
The Australian Independent Record Awards (commonly known informally as AIR Awards) is an annual awards night to recognise, promote and celebrate the success of Australia's Independent Music sector.

|-
| AIR Awards of 2019
|"Losing It"
| Best Independent Dance, Electronica Or Club Single
| 
|-

ARIA Music Awards
The ARIA Music Awards is an annual awards ceremony that recognises excellence, innovation, and achievement across all genres of Australian music. 

|-
| 2018
|"Losing It"
| Best Dance Release
| 
|-
| 2019
| "You Little Beauty"
| Best Dance Release
| 
|-

DJ Magazine's top 100 DJs

International Dance Music Awards
The International Dance Music Awards is an annual awards ceremony held in Miami Beach, Florida, United States as a major part of the Winter Music Conference. The awards commenced in 1985.

Grammy Awards
The Grammy Award is an award presented by the Recording Academy to recognize achievement in the music industry. The awards commenced in 1959.

References

Living people
Musicians from Gold Coast, Queensland
Australian house musicians
Australian surfers
Year of birth missing (living people)